"On The Way To The Sky" is a song by Neil Diamond. It is the title track from his fourteenth studio album. It was written by Diamond and Carole Bayer Sager. The song peaked on the Billboard Hot 100 at #27 in March 1982.

Billboard said that "A downbeat melodyline gives this track its emotional pull."

References

Neil Diamond songs
1982 songs
Songs written by Neil Diamond
Songs written by Carole Bayer Sager